The 2020–21 North American winter was the most significant winter season to affect North America in several years, and the costliest on record, with a damage total of at least $33.35 billion (2021 USD). The season featured 6 storms ranking on the Regional Snowfall Index scale, with 4 storms ranking as at least a Category 3. Most of the winter's damage and fatalities occurred due to a historic and major cold wave in mid-February. Several other significant events occurred, including a crippling early-season ice storm in the Southern Plains, a powerful nor'easter in mid-December, another major nor'easter in early February, two major and widespread winter storms in mid-February, and a major blizzard in the Rocky Mountains in mid-March. The winter-related events were responsible for at least 358 fatalities, making it the deadliest season since 1992–93. A La Niña pattern influenced much of the winter in North America.

Based on the astronomical definition, winter began at the winter solstice on December 21, 2020 and ended at the spring equinox on March 20, 2021. Based on the meteorological definition, the first day of winter was on December 1 and the last day was February 28. However, as illustrated by the Late October ice storm and the Mid-April nor'easter, winter storms occasionally occur outside of these limits. Since both definitions of winter span the start of the calendar year, it is possible to have a winter storm in two different years, as shown by the New Year's winter storm this season. In mid-December, a powerful Category 2 nor'easter affected much of the Northeastern United States with heavy snow and ice. Over  of snow was reported across a swath in the interior Northeast, and the system caused 7 fatalities. In early February, a major Category 3 nor'easter, which started out as a winter storm on the West Coast, impacted an even larger area with heavy snow, also causing 7 fatalities. In mid-February, a series of two major Category 3 winter storms brought a swath of widespread snow and ice from the Pacific Northwest, through the Deep South, and to the Northeast. In total, the two winter storms resulted in at least $27.1 billion in damage, nearly 14 million power outages, and a total of 266 fatalities. In mid-March, a historic Category 3 blizzard unfolded in the Rocky Mountains, with Denver and Cheyenne seeing one of their largest March snowstorms on record.

Seasonal forecasts

On October 15, 2020, the National Oceanic and Atmospheric Administration's Climate Prediction Center released its U.S. Winter Outlook. The temperature and precipitation outlooks reflected the likelihood of a La Niña pattern developing during most of the winter. The forecast called for warmer than average temperatures across much of the southern and southwestern United States, as well as the East Coast, with cooler than average temperatures in the far northwestern United States. Near-average temperatures were expected in the Midwest. The forecast also called for drier than average conditions across almost all of the southeastern and southwestern United States, and wetter than average conditions in much of the northern tier and Midwest, with near-average precipitation in the Northeast and parts of the Midwest.

On November 30, 2020, Environment Canada released its winter outlook for December, January and February as part of their monthly climate outlooks. The agency predicted near to above average temperatures across most of Canada; particularly in the southern regions of the nation, such as southern British Columbia, southern Ontario, Quebec, and especially Atlantic Canada. Below average temperatures were expected to develop in the northern regions of the providences, as well in the northern Canadian Prairies due to the polar vortex and La Nina. Above average precipitation was forecasted to occur in British Columbia, southern Quebec, and quite evidently Atlantic Canada as well.

Seasonal summary

Winter weather events began in late October in North America, with a crippling and devastating ice storm in the Southern Plains, which later merged with the remnants of Hurricane Zeta and produced more snow in New England. November was generally quiet in terms of winter weather, with only a few minor snow events in the Midwest. December began with a nor'easter that impacted parts of New England with heavy snow. Later in the month, a powerful nor'easter brought heavy and impactful snow to widespread areas of the Northeastern United States and southern Canada. Around Christmas week, a powerful blizzard impacted the Midwestern United States and Canada, which also caused severe storms in the Southeast. It later moved on to hit Alaska, after only slightly weakening, causing high surf and gusty winds in the Aleutian Islands.

January and the new year began with a storm system moving from the Gulf of Mexico to the Northeast on New Year's Eve and New Year's Day. Later in the month, a storm originating in the Rocky Mountains produced a swath of wintry weather from New Mexico through Alabama, including areas such as Lubbock, Austin, Metro Houston, and Shreveport, some of which saw over 6 inches of snow accumulation. Towards the middle of the month, a blizzard impacted the Midwest and the interior Northeast, producing heavy snow and extremely gusty winds behind the system. During the last full week of January, a storm with winter weather spanning over 1,500 miles produced snowfall and mixed precipitation from the Midwest to the Northeast, as well as causing severe weather in the Southeast. The system later became a nor'easter bringing heavy and impactful snow to both coastal and interior areas of the Northeast, with both the Boston and New York City metropolitan areas seeing  of snow, in addition to causing over $1.8 billion in damages.

February began with a winter storm that moved through the Great Plains and Midwest, with heavy snow and blizzard-like conditions sparking a 40-vehicle pileup on Interstate 80 eastbound in Iowa, causing several serious injuries. It was followed just a few days later by a fast-moving nor'easter that brought moderate snowfall to the I-95 corridor on the day of Super Bowl LV. Then, a series of major winter storms blasted through the Western, Southern, and Eastern United States bringing heavy snow and ice. The next two storms were both Category 3 winter storms on the Regional Snowfall Index scale, with the first of the storms causing at least 237 fatalities and about $22.5 billion in damage, making it the costliest winter storm on record. The second storm caused at least 29 fatalities and resulted in over $2 billion in damage. The last two storms also resulted in a major power crisis in Texas. In total, the four back-to-back storms resulted in tens of billions of dollars in damage, over 250 fatalities, at least 14 million power outages, and a crisis in the Deep South. Simultaneous to the barrage of winter storms was a historic, long-lived outbreak of Arctic air in the Central United States. Temperatures 30-50 °F (17-28 °C) below average for prolonged periods from February 12–19 resulted in the entire month of February being significantly below average. The month ended with a minor snowstorm that affected areas such as Denver in the Rocky Mountains.
 
March began with a cold wave and windstorm in New England, which prompted wind chill warnings in four states and resulted in over 165,000 power outages. Later in the month, a historic and major blizzard impacted the Rocky Mountains with feet of snow, nearly breaking numerous all-time records, especially in the Denver and Cheyenne areas. It was also responsible for a major late-season snowstorm in the Midwest as well. It was shortly followed by another severe blizzard in the Southern Plains, resulting in near-zero visibility, major highways being stopped for hours, and several injuries. In mid-April, a fairly strong nor'easter moved up the East Coast, resulting in heavy snowfall accumulations in interior New England, as well as widespread lower totals closer to the coast.

Events
There were several winter weather events during the 2020–21 North American winter. Significant events include cold waves, snowstorms, ice storms, blizzards, and other notable events outside the conventional limits of winter.

Late October ice storm
On October 27, a winter storm named Billy by the weather channel delivered heavy snow to Colorado, New Mexico, Western Texas, and Kansas, while a crippling ice storm hit Central Oklahoma, and Western North Texas including Oklahoma City. The ice storm resulted in widespread tree damage and over 400,000 customers being put without power, 40,000 of whom remained out of power ten days later. It was one of the worst ice storms in Oklahoma City history. The Storm led to the United States's most extensive October snow cover since 1967. The ice storm is estimated to have caused over $125 million (2020 USD) in damage. There were also two deaths: one in Kansas and one in Texas.

Hurricane Zeta-related snow event

The winter storm that affected the Southern Plains merged with the leftover moisture and remnants of Hurricane Zeta, resulting in another snow event across parts of southern New England and upstate New York on October 30. This early-season snowstorm resulted in some downed tree branches in the region. The snowstorm also caused slippery road surfaces, leading to numerous crashes, some serious, in the state of Massachusetts.

Highs that day struggled to get into the 40s.

Late November storm complex

On November 29, two low pressure systems, one from the Gulf of Mexico and one from Canada, formed the low from the Gulf of Mexico. The southern system moved east then northeastward towards the Appalachian Mountains. The low from Canada came from Manitoba and moved southeastward towards the Great Lakes region. On November 30, snowfall was recorded in cities such as Toledo, Detroit, Chicago, and Cleveland. The next day on December 1 snowfall started in Pittsburgh. The system also produced heavy rainfall, high winds, and several weak tornadoes to the East Coast. It is estimated to have caused at least $100 million (2020 USD) in damage.

December nor'easters

Early December nor'easter

On December 4, a nor'easter developed from an area of low pressure moving off the Mid-Atlantic coast and began to rapidly intensify. Ahead of the storm, Winter Storm Warnings were issued in a swath from the northern parts of Connecticut and Rhode Island to Maine's border with Canada. On December 5, the nor'easter made landfall in coastal New England while brushing the coastline. By midday December 6, only flurries lingered over the Northeast, as the storm was moving deeper into Eastern Canada. The nor'easter is estimated to have caused at least $25 million (2021 USD) in damage.

Mid-December nor'easter

On December 16, a second major nor'easter began affecting parts of New England and the Mid-Atlantic. The storm was described as a "blockbuster storm" by AccuWeather. The nor'easter formed on December 16 and continued affect the Northeast into the 17th. A swath of 12–18+ inches of snow extended from central Pennsylvania through most of southern New England. Williamsport and Binghamton both saw their largest snowstorms on record. Coastal Massachusetts experienced high winds, exceeding 60 mph in gusts, along with the snowfall, causing significant blowing snow.

Major cities saw much less but still disruptive amounts of snow, including amounts in Washington D.C., Philadelphia, New York City, Pittsburgh, and Boston, ending a 1,000+ day high-impact snowstorm drought in the Mid-Atlantic and coastal New England regions. More than 70 million people were affected throughout the Northeast. The nor'easter also caused significant impacts in Atlantic Canada; schools, government offices, public parks and recreation programs in the city of Halifax, Nova Scotia all had delayed openings or closures on December 18. It is estimated to have caused at least $125 million (2021 USD) in damage.

Christmas Week blizzard
A powerful blizzard began impacting the Upper Midwest starting on December 23, disrupting travel ahead of Christmas. A pileup occurred on Interstate 29 in South Dakota, implicating 20 vehicles and injuring a few people. 298 flights were cancelled and another 46 delayed at Minneapolis-St. Paul International Airport. Strong winds, gusting up to 68 mph, left 10,000 customers without power in Minnesota. Almost zero visibility was reported on highways in South Dakota, Minnesota, and Nebraska, as Highway Patrol warned people to stay off the roads. Locations in far northern Minnesota and Wisconsin accumulated over a foot of snow. The storm system responsible for the blizzard also brought severe weather to the East Coast; the Storm Prediction Center issued an "Enhanced" risk of severe weather for eastern North Carolina and nearby portions of South Carolina and Virginia on December 24. Five tornadoes were reported in the Southeastern U.S. on December 23; another one was reported as well on December 24, and non-tornadic wind damage was reported across several states. Some spots in northern New England saw higher temperatures on Christmas then the 4th of July. In total, the blizzard is estimated to have caused at least $340 million (2021 USD) in damages.The Blizzard was Named Winter Storm Harold by the weather channel.

Late December Bering Sea cyclone

In late December, an extremely powerful extratropical cyclone developed in the far Northern Pacific Ocean, and explosively deepened late on December 30–31 as it neared the Bering Sea. Hurricane force wind warnings were issued for parts of the Aleutian Islands as well.

New Year's winter storm

An upper-level low formed in the Gulf of Mexico and came ashore on December 30–31, and snow, freezing rain and sleet began to fall on December 30, prompting winter storm warnings across the West Texas region and extending into Oklahoma. The unusual severity of the winter weather led to the closure of Interstate 10, which stranded dozens of travelers that had to seek shelter in two school gyms in Marfa. Peak accumulations in Texas reached  in Big Bend National Park.

The storm system continued moving Northeastward and brought 5.1 and 6.5 inches to Oklahoma City and Witchita, Kansas respectively. Nearly half an inch of ice accumulated in parts of Illinois and Pennsylvania. Along the Canadian border with Upstate New York and Vermont, up to 7 inches of snow fell. The swath of wintry weather extended over 2,200 miles. The storm complex is estimated to have caused at least $35 million (2021 USD) in damage.

Mid-January blizzard
On January 12, a low pressure came ashore in the Pacific Northwest, causing heavy rain, mountain snow, and damaging winds in much of Washington, Oregon and British Columbia. It then moved into the Great Plains and Upper Midwest, bringing damaging winds along with heavy snow, prompting Winter Storm and Blizzard Warnings in many of those areas. The surface low pressure later moved into the Upper Midwest, bringing blustery conditions and snow to much of the area. The low pressure stalled on January 15, and blizzard conditions continued in parts of the Upper Midwest. Winter Weather Advisories and Winter Storm Watches were issued in portions of the interior Northeast, in anticipation of the storm moving there next. Later, Winter Storm Watches in the Northeast were upgraded to Winter Storm Warnings as the storm moved into the Northeast. The precipitation was generally all rain along the coast, but interior sections saw some snow from the system. It is estimated to have caused at least $525 million (2021 USD) in damage.

Late January winter storm and cold wave
On January 25, snow began accumulating in portions of Nebraska and Iowa as a winter storm began developing and traveling east. Winter Storm Warnings went into effect for counties in Iowa and northern Illinois. The storm lasted into the following day, having reached a maximum size of around 1,500 miles from east to west. Parts of the Midwest saw more than one foot of snow, while mixed precipitation occurred in the Ohio Valley and Northeast. Des Moines International Airport recorded  of snowfall on Monday. Several schools and districts in central Iowa cancelled classes or started them late on Tuesday morning, while the Des Moines Public Schools district held classes virtually. Overnight, the storm also caused severe weather in the Southeast, including a tornado in Fultondale, Alabama which killed one person and injured many others. It also caused many power outages and widespread damage north of Birmingham, Alabama. On January 26, snow and ice began moving into the Northeast, and began becoming more widespread as the day progressed. Winter Storm Warnings were put into effect for portions of southern Pennsylvania and western Maryland. In New York, only Oneida County was put under a winter storm warning, which is unusual as usually winter storm warnings are issued for multiple counties, not just one. The winter storm is estimated to have caused at least $120 million (2021 USD) in damages.

On January 28, following the storm, an Arctic air outbreak began to take shape in southern Canada, and the next day the cold air reached New England. Wind chill advisories were issued in northern and central New England, as well as in upstate New York. Actual high temperatures failed to reach  in many areas in New England and upstate New York, with wind chill highs barely reaching . The cold air lingered into the night, with wind chill advisories being issued once again in many areas.

Late January–early February nor'easters

Groundhog Day nor'easter

Following a series of weaker winter storms impacting the United States, another arrived on the West Coast. The night of January 26 into January 27, Northern California experienced extreme wind gusts, peaking at  near Alpine Meadows. The winds downed trees onto powerlines and homes, causing >400,000 customers to lose power. Additionally, the storm caused an atmospheric river event over parts of the state still recovering from burn scars due to the previous wildfire season, causing several mudslides, one of which destroyed a portion of Highway 1. The combination of extreme winds and extremely intense precipitation caused blizzard conditions near Weed. Once the storm system began to move inland, Winter Storm Watches were issued in some areas of the Midwest and Ohio Valley. 12.9 inches of snow fell in Romeoville. Also, 10.8 and 11.3 inches of snow fell at O'Hare and Midway airports respectively. Nearby, 8 to 10 inches fell in the Milwaukee metro area and 13.5 inches fell in northern Indiana.

Shortly thereafter, the storm developed into a nor'easter and began moving up the coast slowly, dumping excessive amounts of snow on the I-95 corridor. 4.5 inches of snow fell in D.C., 5.2 inches in Baltimore, 7.8 inches in Philadelphia, 18.2 inches in Newark, New Jersey, 17.2 inches in Central Park, New York, 15.2 inches in New Haven, and 24 inches in Lowell, Massachusetts. The highest snowfall total from the nor'easter phase of the storm was 36.1 inches in Nazareth, Pennsylvania. The system is estimated to have caused over $1.85 billion in damage.

Super Bowl Sunday nor'easter

Another nor'easter began taking shape late on February 6 in the form of a low pressure system off the coast of South Carolina. Ahead of the storm, winter storm warnings were issued from Georgia to Massachusetts. Snow broke out in interior portions of the Carolinas and Virginia; Saluda, North Carolina and Wise, Virginia picked up 6.3 and 8 inches respectively. Then the storm's effects moved up into the I-95 corridor, where totals exceeding 6 inches were widespread. 9.1 inches was reported near Westwood, New Jersey, 6.5 inches at JFK International Airport, 8 and 7.4 inches at North Haven and Bridgeport Airport in Connecticut, 14 inches at Pascoag, Rhode Island and 12 inches in Norfolk, Massachusetts. Afterwards, the storm affected Atlantic Canada, where up to 50 cm of snow fell in Halifax. As a result, across the entire region, public transportation was shutdown, government offices and schools were closed, postal services were delayed and the regular ferry crossing service in the Cabot Channel was suspended.

February cold wave 

Wind chill advisories and wind chill warnings were issued from eastern Montana into Wisconsin and all the way to northern Illinois in early February. The following week widespread record-challenging cold remained in place over central parts of Canada and the United States. Canada recorded its coldest temperature since 2017;  in Wekweeti, Northwest Territories. In Livingston, Montana, the daily cold record for February 13 was broken and temperatures fell to  there.

The cold later spread southwards to areas such as Texas, where temperatures reached  in parts of the state on February 14. Some parts of the state experienced temperatures over 50 °F below normal. Records from over a century were broken: on February 16, daily record lows were broken in Oklahoma City (coldest since 1899 and the second-coldest on record), Dallas (coldest since 1930 and the second-coldest on record), Houston (coldest since 1989), San Antonio (coldest since 1989) and Little Rock (coldest since 1989), with all-time low temperatures being set in Fayetteville, Arkansas and Hastings, Nebraska. This put a strain on the state's power grid, resulting in the Southwest Power Pool and the Electric Reliability Council of Texas both instituting rolling blackouts.

Mid-February winter storms

February 10–12 and 11–14 ice storms

On February 10, an ice storm began impacting states in the Ohio Valley region as well as the Upland South. In Louisville, road crews and utility workers began preparing for a major ice storm on February 8. The City of Louisville Department of Public Works began preparing for a mass pre-treatment of the roads in the area, getting thousands of tons of salt and brine ready. Over 200 snow and ice removal vehicles were prepared to be treating the roads during the storm. Utility workers began preparing to work for many hours fixing the power due to outages from snow and ice. Two people were killed in car accidents in Kentucky. On February 10, Delta Airlines flight 2231 slid off a taxiway prior to takeoff due to ice accumulations at Pittsburgh International Airport, although there were no casualties. On the early morning of February 11, 2021, due to the frigid weather, Interstate 35W in Fort Worth, Texas was icy, which was unusual for the area. As a result, at 6:30 AM CST the first collision occurred when a vehicle skidded off the road, which led to several vehicles, including semi-trucks, to pile up on the freeway. Ultimately, 133 cars piled in the incident which left motorists trapped in their vehicles. Six people died and sixty-five people were transported to a local hospital. The National Transportation Safety Board is performing a safety investigation of the crash. The storm is estimated to have caused over $75 million (2021 USD) in damages.

From February 11–12, the next storm brought light to moderate snow to the Rocky Mountains. Then, energy from that storm later caused a significant icing event in the Mid-Atlantic and Appalachians. From Kentucky to North Carolina, 480,000 customers were left without power. Additionally, downed trees and powerlines caused significant disruption in Virginia, where a winter weather state of emergency was placed into effect. The 6.1 inches of snowfall in Portland, Oregon on February 12 ties the airport monthly record of 6.1 inches set Feb 19, 1993. The event proved to be historic for the Portland metropolitan area in the month of February. The first Ice Storm Warning ever issued for Richmond, Virginia was due to this storm.

February 13–17 winter storm

A third, unusually significant winter storm impacted the Pacific Northwest from February 12 to 13; Seattle received  of snow. Texas Governor Greg Abbott announced a federal emergency declaration after a significant snow event in Texas accompanied by extreme cold.

The storm caused blackouts for nearly 10 million customers in the United States and in northern Mexico, triggering a severe power crisis in Texas in the process. The storm killed at least 237 people, including 223 in the United States and 14 in Mexico. This storm is estimated to have caused over $196.5 billion (2021 USD) in damages, including at least $195 billion in the United States and over $1.5 billion in Mexico, making it the costliest winter storm recorded in U.S. history and worldwide.

February 15–20 winter storm

A fourth storm brought a record-breaking  of snow to Del Rio, Texas and threatened Little Rock, Arkansas's snowfall record with  falling there. Up to  fell to the south of the city.

Impacts from the storm stretched all the way into Massachusetts. 100 cars became stranded on roadways near Florence, Alabama due to the wintry weather. The system killed at least 29 people, and it is estimated to have caused at least $2 billion (2021 USD) in damages.

Early March New England cold wave
On February 28, an Arctic airmass began working its way south into southern Canada, behind a low pressure system in a trough in the jet stream. The next day, the powerful low pressure swung northeastward into the Canadian Maritimes, as two cold fronts behind the system ushered in an Arctic airmass into the Northeast and New England. A strong pressure gradient set up later in the day behind the now stationary low pressure, unleashing powerful winds. Very cold temperatures and strong winds continued into March 2, with wind chill high temperatures barely reaching  in many areas. The strong winds and cold temperatures caused over 165,000 power outages in New England during the event from March 1–2. Parts of US 1 closed due to the blowing snow.

Mid-March blizzards

March 11–14 blizzard

A significant blizzard brought Cheyenne their largest two-day snowfall on record with 30.8 inches falling from March 13–14. The storm closed schools and colleges and city and state government buildings. Schools and government offices also shut down in Casper. Denver received their second-largest March snowfall on record with 27.1 inches falling at the airport. The storm was also Denver's fourth-largest snowstorm on record. The storm shut down major highways, caused more than 2,000 flights to be canceled and left over 50,000 customers without power. The system caused at least $75 million in damages.

March 16–17 blizzard

Late on March 16, Blizzard Warnings were issued for the Texas and Oklahoma panhandles and surrounding areas. On the following day, near-zero visibility was reported in the area for hours in a row, causing numerous crashes and bringing parts of Highway 70 to a standstill. Crashes as well as extremely poor road conditions resulted in closures on several major highways, including I-40 and US-287. The blizzard was also followed by a flash freeze overnight on March 17, resulting in a freeze-up of snow-covered roadways and more crashes overnight.

Mid-April nor'easter

On April 14, Winter Storm Watches were issued in much of interior New England, and the next day, watches were expanded and Winter Storm Warnings were also issued. Precipitation initially started as rain on April 15, but slowly changed over to snow in the mountains overnight. By the next morning, the rain-snow line had pushed as far east as the eastern Massachusetts coast.

Records

United States

The cities of Billings, Montana and Fargo, North Dakota experienced their longest streak of sub-zero temperatures since at least 1983 and 1996, respectively.

Del Rio, Texas picked up  of snow from February 17–18, breaking the all-time one-day and 24-hour snowfall records, both of which had previously been set in January 1985. Austin realized their snowiest February on record.

October 2020 was the snowiest October on record in Spokane, Washington, with a record  falling there. Great Falls, Montana also saw their snowiest October on record, as did Boston.

The Blue Hill Observatory in Milton, Massachusetts saw  of snow from a nor'easter on April 16, making it their sixth-largest April snowstorm on record. Paducah, Kentucky and Evansville, Indiana saw their latest ever snowflakes on April 21. May 2021 became the 9th snowiest May in Binghamton, New York. On the opposite end, several cities in Wyoming saw their earliest snow on record on September 8, while Goodland, Kansas saw their earliest measurable snow on September 9.

This became the snowiest February across portions of Northern New Jersey as well. Parts of northeastern Pennsylvania also recorded their second snowiest February.

Glasgow, Montana and Bismarck, North Dakota saw their warmest first half of winter on record, which was tied in Sioux Falls, South Dakota. International Falls, Minnesota and Fargo, North Dakota ranked second.

Northern Mexico

In the city of Saltillo, temperatures reached as low as  early on February 16 as bitterly cold air continental polar surged south from Canada and the United States into Mexico. They were the coldest temperatures reported within the city since the Early 2014 North American cold wave.

Season effects
This is a table of all of the events that have occurred in the 2020–21 North American winter. It includes their duration, damage, impacted locations, and death totals. Deaths in parentheses are additional and indirect (an example of an indirect death would be a traffic accident), but were still related to that storm. All of the damage figures are in 2021 USD.

See also

North American winter
Winter storm
2020–21 European windstorm season
Weather of 2021

References

External links

2020 and 2021 Storm Summaries from the Weather Prediction Center

 
2020 meteorology
2021 meteorology
2020 in North America
2021 in North America
North American winters
Power outages in the United States